Ho Tung Lau is a former area northeast of Lok Lo Ha in Sha Tin, near the MTR and on the former shore of Sha Tin Hoi, in the New Territories, Hong Kong. Maps from the mid-1960s onward shifted Ho Tung Lau southwest-ward to the same location as Lok Lo Ha.

Following construction of the MTR, the Ho Tung Lau Maintenance Centre was built on reclaimed land next to Fo Tan in Sha Tin with its north end in Lok Lo Ha. The actual location of Ho Tung Lau has gradually been forgotten, and Ho Tung Lau is more likely to be associated with the area near the maintenance centre. The Fo Tan station is also next to the maintenance centre. Two private housing estates, Royal Ascot and The Palazzo, have been developed on the old site of Ho Tung Lau.

The name of Ho Tung Lau is derived from the name of successful businessman Robert Hotung. The character Lau means a building in Cantonese. Robert Hotung had bought a land near the Sha Tin Hoi and built a house on it.

See also 
Ho Tung Gardens

Places in Hong Kong
Fo Tan